Xiang Huaicheng (born February 1939) is a Chinese economist and former minister of finance of China.

Biography
Xiang Huangcheng  was born in Wujiang County, Jiangsu in February 1939. He joined Communist Party of China in 1983. He graduated from the Department of Chinese Literature at Shandong University in 1960, and is a senior economist.

1986.6–1992.5, deputy minister of finance, member of the party's committee.

1992.5–1994.7, deputy minister of finance, vice secretary of the party's committee.

1994.7–1995.1, deputy director of State Administration of Taxation, vice secretary of the party's committee.

1995.1–1998.3, deputy director of State Administration of Taxation, secretary of the party's committee.

1998.3–2003.3, minister of finance.

2003.5–2008.1, director-general of the national social security funds.

He was a member of 15th and 16th Central Committee of Communist Party of China.

He is currently the Chairman of China Development Institute in Shenzhen.

References

People's Republic of China economists
1939 births
Living people
Ministers of Finance of the People's Republic of China
Politicians from Suzhou
Economists from Jiangsu
People's Republic of China politicians from Jiangsu
Chinese Communist Party politicians from Jiangsu